The Toll-Gate is a Regency novel by Georgette Heyer, which takes place in 1817. Unlike many of Heyer's historical novels which concentrate on a plucky heroine, this one follows the adventures of a male main character, an ex-captain in the British Army who has returned from the Peninsular War and finds life as a civilian rather dull. The setting for this detective/romance story is in and around a Toll-Gate in the Peak District, vastly different from the elegant backgrounds of London, Bath, Brighton, or some stately home, which characterize most of Heyer's Regency novels.

Plot introduction
After acting as an aide-de-camp at the Battle of Waterloo, Jack Staple is finding civilian life tedious. Following a formal (and somewhat boring) dinner party in honour of his cousin's engagement, Jack sets out by himself on horseback to visit a more congenial friend some 60 miles away. After getting lost in the dark and rain he reaches a toll-gate where a frightened 10-year-old lad is acting as toll collector in the absence of his father. A combination of curiosity, compassion, tiredness, and dampness lead him to stay at the toll house overnight with a view to sorting out the situation in the morning.

Over the next few days Jack's circle of acquaintances rapidly expands to include a highwayman, a Bow Street runner, and the local gentry plus their devoted retainers. Other complications include a dead body, stolen treasure, and some masked villains. In the process of preventing a scandal, Jack also manages to identify the murderer, deal with the villains, retrieve the treasure, satisfy the law, provide for his friends, and resolve his own romance.

Characters in "The Toll-Gate"

Major characters
Jack (John) Staple, ex-Captain of Dragoon Guards, 29 years old, tall and strong.
Sir Peter Stornaway, local squire, bed-ridden following a stroke.
Nell Stornaway, granddaughter to Sir Peter, 26 years old, tall.
Jerry Chirk, highwayman.
Gabriel Stogumber, Bow Street Runner.

Minor characters
Henry Stornaway, grandson and heir to Sir Peter, cousin to Nell.
Nathaniel Coate, friend to Henry.
Gunn, servant to Nathaniel.
Wilfred Babbacombe, friend to Jack, an ex-Army colleague.
Edward Brean, toll-gate keeper, missing from his post.
Ben Brean, son to Edward, 11 years old.
Mr Willitoft, trustee of the Derbyshire Tolls

Devoted retainers
Rose Durward, maid to Nell
Huby, butler to Sir Peter
Winkfield, valet to Sir Peter
Joe Lydd, groom to Sir Peter and to Nell

References

1954 British novels
Novels by Georgette Heyer
British adventure novels
British historical novels
Fiction set in 1817
Novels set in Derbyshire
Heinemann (publisher) books